Kurdistan Region–Poland relations are bilateral relations between Kurdistan Region and Poland. Kurdistan Region is represented in Poland through a representation in Warsaw since 2004, while Poland has a consulate general in Erbil since 2012. In 2005, Polish Prime Minister Marek Belka, Foreign Minister Adam Rotfeld, Minister of National Defense Jerzy Szmajdziński and Minister of Culture Waldemar Dąbrowski met Kurdish President Masoud Barzani and Prime Minister Nechirvan Barzani in Erbil and stated their support for the reconstruction of Iraq, including Kurdistan Region.

History
When Poland joined the American-led invasion of Iraq in 2003, it wanted to have responsibility for the northern parts of the country including Kurdistan Region, mostly due to the security of the region. Eventually, Poland acquired responsibility for the Multinational Division Central-South (Polish zone in Iraq), but good relations with Kurdistan Region became a result of the Polish involvement in the war. In the first years after Kurdistan Region achieved autonomy in 2005, Poland had a careful policy towards the region, for the sake of Iraqi territorial integrity and the good relations to Baghdad. Nevertheless, this policy slowly changed with the opening of a Polish consulate in 2012, but can still be seen in the lack of military support for Kurdish soldiers (Peshmerga).

In 2014, the Polish government sent eight tonnes of humanitarian aid to Erbil for the growing number of internally displaced persons. In 2017, after Kurdish Minister of Martyrs and Anfal Affairs Mahmood Salih Hama visited Poland and the state-owned Auschwitz-Birkenau Memorial and Museum, Kurdistan Region and experts from the museum reached an agreement concerning the documentation of the genocide against Kurds. Deputy Marshal of the Sejm Stanisław Tyszka stated that Poland would approve the Kurdish independence referendum held in September 2017.

References

Foreign relations of Kurdistan Region
Foreign relations of Poland